The 1970–71 season was Newport County's ninth consecutive season in the Football League Fourth Division since relegation at the end of the 1961–62 season and their 43rd overall in the Football League. The season saw the worst set of results in County's history, with the club failing to win any of the first 25 league matches, setting a Football League record.

The season started with a home and away loss, but County were still two places from the foot of the table. However their record of three wins and five draws from the next 31 games left them rooted to the bottom. Results improved in the latter stages of the season, with County picking up seven wins and three draws in the remaining 13 games. The club still had to apply for re-election for the third successive season, but held on to their League status.

Season review

Results summary

Results by round

Fixtures and results

Fourth Division

FA Cup

League Cup

Welsh Cup

League table

Election

References

 Amber in the Blood: A History of Newport County.

External links
 Newport County 1970-1971 : Results
 Newport County football club match record: 1971
 Welsh Cup 1970/71

1970-71
English football clubs 1970–71 season
1970–71 in Welsh football